"The Calzone" is the 130th episode of the NBC sitcom Seinfeld. This is the 20th episode of the seventh season, originally airing on April 25, 1996. In this episode, George Costanza gets the ear of George Steinbrenner by having calzones for lunch with him, Elaine repeatedly goes out to dinner and movies with a guy who never actually asks her out, and Kramer heats his clothes in dryers and ovens.

Plot
Steinbrenner becomes intrigued by George's lunch, a calzone, during a meeting. George allows him to try it. Steinbrenner then has George bring him a calzone for lunch every day, allowing George to effectively become his right hand advisor. Frustrated that the Paisano's restaurant owner chances to look away when he puts money into the tip jar two days in a row, George tries to fish out his money. The owner turns and, thinking George is stealing money from the jar, bans him from the shop. George tries unsuccessfully to persuade Steinbrenner to switch to something different for lunch. So that he can stay in Steinbrenner's good graces, George makes a deal with Newman, whose mail route brings him past Paisano's every day, to obtain the calzones in exchange for George footing the entire bill.

Elaine is taken out to dinner by Todd Gack because he lost a bet with her that Dustin Hoffman was in Star Wars. Jerry believes the bet was spurious, a way of getting a date with Elaine without having to ask her out (and therefore risk being rejected). Todd offers to sell Jerry some Cuban cigars, allowing him to go out to dinner with Elaine again in order to deliver them, but they turn out to be from Peru. Todd continues to insist he is not dating Elaine, even after he takes her to dinner with his parents.

Jerry takes advantage of his beautiful girlfriend Nicki's ability to get anything she wants, including convincing a cop to not give him a speeding ticket, by asking her to convince Todd he shouldn't have to pay for the cigars. However, when Todd sees Nicki he winds up wheedling a dinner with her, leaving Elaine feeling she has been dumped.

Kramer begins wearing only clothes that have come straight out of the dryer, because the warmth is comfortable. When he runs out of quarters for the dryer, he turns to using ovens to warm his clothing.

To George's frustration, Newman calls in sick and does not go to work because it is raining (despite the postman's creed). George asks Kramer to get him a calzone. Kramer gets wet in the rain, so he puts his clothes in the pizza oven at Paisano's, and they get burned. He tries to pay for the calzones with small change, and is turned away. Kramer goes to George's office to tell him what happened and drops his burnt clothes by a vent. In desperation, George goes to purchase calzones from a different restaurant. The smell from Kramer's clothes wafts into Steinbrenner's office, and he runs to George's office, thinking he has calzones. Steinbrenner realizes the smell is from the clothes.

Kramer pays for the Peruvian cigars with his change.

Production
Writers Alec Berg and Jeff Schaffer got the inspiration for the episode when they took a break from writing for calzones and their contribution to the tip jar went unnoticed. Kramer's Italian rant was unscripted, and was improvised by actor Michael Richards during filming.

In an unused ending to the George story, Steinbrenner decides he no longer wants calzones because the cheese is bad for his health, and says he'll have "a big salad" instead.

Critical response
Linda S. Ghent, Professor in the Department of Economics at Eastern Illinois University, discusses this episode in terms of incentive and explains:

George puts a dollar in the tip jar at the pizzeria, but the counterman's head was turned and he didn't see it. George laments that it cost him a dollar, but he got no credit for it. His altruism is not pure - he gets utility not from giving, but from getting credit for giving.

References

External links

Seinfeld (season 7) episodes
1996 American television episodes
Calzones